Greasy Rock Creek is a stream in the U.S. state of Tennessee.

According to tradition, pioneers would lie on a rock while drinking from the creek. The bear grease on the pioneers' clothing transferred to the rock, hence the name Greasy Rock Creek.

References

Rivers of Hancock County, Tennessee
Rivers of Tennessee